World Soccer '94: Road to Glory (also known as Striker in Europe, Eric Cantona Football Challenge in France and World Soccer in Japan) is a 1993 soccer video game for the Super NES which was released in North America by Atlus Software.

Gameplay
The game lets the player choose from five different modes, including indoor soccer, and then pick from 128 different international teams, all with different strengths and weaknesses. Unlike in the original game where the strongest or the most well-known teams had real names, in World Soccer '94: Road to Glory all the footballers' names are fictitious. Every UEFA (Europe) CAF (Africa) CONCACAF (North America Central America The & Caribbean) AFC (Asia) OFC (Oceania) team of that time appears in the game except for Yugoslavia, which was banned from international competition from 1992 to 1994 for being at war with itself. World Soccer '94: Road to Glory doesn't have a language-select prompt at the opening screen.

There are many options and features, for example, the pitch surface changes field conditions in outdoor friendlies; wet surfaces are slower than drier ones. Wind Strength can affect the flight of the ball, new FIFA Rules affects whether or not extra time will use the "Golden Goal" (sudden death) rules - since abolished. Auto Keeper will, when turned on, make the goalkeeper kick the ball upfield automatically after saved shots on target. After saves, the goalkeeper takes control automatically unless "Auto Keeper" is turned OFF.

External links

World Soccer '94: Road to Glory at SNESMusic.org

1993 video games
Association football video games
Atlus games
Super Nintendo Entertainment System games
Super Nintendo Entertainment System-only games
Video games developed in the United Kingdom
Multiplayer and single-player video games
Rage Games games